Brubank is an Argentine digital bank. Headquartered in Buenos Aires, Brubank is a financial technology company offering mobile banking, as well as other financial services. It is recognized as the first entirely digital bank in Argentina.

Services 

Brubank associates all its users accounts to a Visa debit card. It also offers exchange service between United States dollars and Argentine pesos and time deposits in those currencies.

History 

Brubank was founded in 2017. Juan Bruchou, CEO of Citibank Argentina, had proposed an entirely digital bank, without branch offices. Brubank obtained license by the Central Bank of Argentina to operate in September 2018. After a first "friends and family" trial, Brubank launched its app on Apple and Android stores. In August 2019, Canadian billionaire David Thomson bought a 15 percent stake in Brubank.

See also 
 Ualá

References

External links 
 Official website

Android (operating system) software
Financial technology
Personal finance
Online financial services companies of Argentina
Neobanks
Companies based in Buenos Aires